Alasdair Hugh Wilson Boyle' (born Glasgow) was a Scottish rugby union player. He played as a number eight.

He also played for London Scottish FC.

He had 6 caps for Scotland, from 1966 to 1968, scoring 1 try, 3 points on aggregate. He played in two Five Nations Championship competitions, in 1966 and 1967.

His brother Cameron Boyle was also capped for Scotland.

References
 Bath, Richard (ed.) The Scotland Rugby Miscellany (Vision Sports Publishing Ltd, 2007 )

1945 births
Living people
Rugby union players from Glasgow
Scottish rugby union players
Scotland international rugby union players
Ayr RFC players
London Scottish F.C. players
Rugby union number eights